The Thralls is a Danish animated historical TV series from 1978–1980 directed by Danish animator Jannik Hastrup and based on 's book series . The series tells about life at the bottom of society in Sweden from around 1000 until the middle of the 19th century. The series is in three sections, each with three parts that can be viewed independently of each other.

References

External links 
 
 
 Trællene at Tegnefilm.com

1970s historical films
1978 animated films
1978 films
Danish animated films
Dutch historical films
Films set in the Viking Age